Cornufer acrochordus, also known as the Bougainville wrinkled ground frog, is a species of frog in the family Ceratobatrachidae. It is endemic to the Solomon Islands archipelago and occurs on Bougainville (Papua New Guinea), Choiseul, and Santa Isabel Islands (Solomon Islands), although its distribution in the archipelago is not properly known. The specific name acrochordus is Greek for "warty" and refers to the warty skin of this species.

Description
Adult males measure  and adult females  in snout–vent length. The overall appearance is moderately broad and depressed. The eyes are moderately large. The snout is broadly rounded. The tympanum is distinct. The finger tips are round-pointed to pointed. The toe tips are pointed and slightly dilated. No webbing is present. Dorsal surfaces of the body and the limbs bear prominent, roundish tubercles. The dorsum also  has some elongated folds. The venter bears coarse, rounded granules. Preserved specimens are dorsally grayish to black, usually mottled with a broad  patch. blotched light and dark brown. The limbs have light and dark crossbars. Lips have dark bars.

Habitat and conservation
The lowland locations were in tropical rainforest where the frogs were active at night on the forest floor, whereas the Bougainville specimens were found on cliffs in steep mountains, and in cracks and fissures in the ground. Development is direct (i.e, there is no free-living larval stage) and the eggs are laid in fissures.

Cornufer acrochordus is generally rare and hard to find. It is potentially threatened by logging.

References

acrochordus
Amphibians of Papua New Guinea
Amphibians of the Solomon Islands
Amphibians described in 1965
Taxa named by Walter Creighton Brown
Taxonomy articles created by Polbot